
This is a list of players who graduated from the Nationwide Tour in 2005. The top 21 players on the Nationwide Tour's money list in 2005 earned their PGA Tour card for 2006.

*PGA Tour rookie for 2006.
#Gore received a battlefield promotion to the PGA Tour in 2005 by winning three tournaments on the Nationwide Tour in 2005. On the PGA Tour in 2005, he played in 8 tournaments, making 6 cuts and winning the 84 Lumber Classic.
T = Tied
Green background indicates the player retained his PGA Tour card for 2007 (won or finished inside the top 125).
Yellow background indicates the player did not retain his PGA Tour card for 2007, but retained conditional status (finished between 126–150).
Red background indicates the player did not retain his PGA Tour card for 2007 (finished outside the top 150).

Winners on the PGA Tour in 2006

Runners-up on the PGA Tour in 2006

See also
2005 PGA Tour Qualifying School graduates

References
Schedule
Money list
Player profiles

Korn Ferry Tour
PGA Tour
Nationwide Tour Graduates
Nationwide Tour Graduates